Quinn Henderson Becker (June 11, 1930 – March 13, 2022) was a lieutenant general in the United States Army. He was Surgeon General of the United States Army from February 1985 to May 1988. Becker, who attended Louisiana State University's School of Medicine, was an orthopedic surgeon. He earned a B.S. degree from Northeast Louisiana State College in 1952 and then received his M.D. degree and Army commission in 1956. Before this stint as Surgeon General, Becker was Commandant of the United States Army Academy of Health Sciences, Deputy Surgeon General of the Army, and Chief Surgeon of the U.S. European Command. He was promoted to Lieutenant General in March 1985. Becker died on March 13, 2022, at the age of 91.

Awards and recognitions

References

1930 births
2022 deaths
People from Kirksville, Missouri
Military personnel from Missouri
Physicians from Missouri
University of Louisiana at Monroe alumni
Louisiana State University alumni
American orthopedic surgeons
United States Army Medical Corps officers
United States Army personnel of the Vietnam War
Recipients of the Legion of Merit
United States Army generals
Recipients of the Distinguished Service Medal (US Army)
Surgeons General of the United States Army